John Forde may refer to:
 John Forde (Gaelic footballer)
 John Forde (rugby union)

See also
 John Ford (disambiguation)